The Tata Xover (pronounced "crossover") is a 7-seat crossover SUV concept car created by the Indian automaker Tata Motors. It was first introduced at the 2005 Geneva Motor Show.

In January 2010, the Xover's real market version was launched with minor changes in the AutoExpo in New Delhi, India. It has been launched as the Tata Aria. Most of the body design remains unchanged except for the grill, headlamps and minor cosmetics.

See also
Other concept cars by Tata Motors
 2004 Tata Indigo Advent
 2007 Tata Elegante
 2009 Tata Prima

Xover